Bohemian National Hall is an historic building located in the Broadway–Slavic Village neighborhood of Cleveland, Ohio. It was listed on the National Register of Historic Places in May 1975. The hall was built to serve the cultural and educational needs of the city's Czech community, and currently serves as host to Sokol Greater Cleveland and the Cleveland Czech Cultural Center and Museum.

Building history
Bohemian National Hall was built in 1896-97 by Czech immigrants in Cleveland, reportedly becoming the "first hall in the city owned by a nationality group." The idea of the hall emerged in the 1880s in the Lodge Bratri v Kruhu of the Czech Slovak Benevolent Association. The fundraising effort was led by Czech American journalist Václav Šnajdr, and the building was designed by Andrew Mitermiler, John Hradek, and the Cleveland architectural firm of Steffens, Searles and Hirsh.

On October 22 and 23, 1915, Bohemian National Hall was the site of the signing of the Cleveland Agreement by Czech American and Slovak American representatives. The agreement was a precursor to the Pittsburgh Agreement, calling for the formation of a joint Czech and Slovak state, which was realized with the founding of Czechoslovakia in 1918.

Over the years, the building's exterior darkened appreciably due to the pollution from nearby steel mills. Sokol, a local Czech American society which promotes athletics and healthy living, purchased the building for $35,000 ($ in  dollars) in 1975.

Bohemian National Hall underwent a $400,000 ($ in  dollars) renovation in 1997. In the first floor lobby, paint was stripped from the quarter-sawn oak molding and panelling and a false wall removed to reveal a wrought iron screen. The walls of the grand ballroom on the second floor were cleaned of more than a century of grime, and two ornate hand-carved columns were rescued and placed in the third-floor museum. An elevator was also added to the structure, to make the fourth floor gymnasium more accessible.

In 1998, Sokol began construction on a $1.5 million ($ in  dollars),  addition to the Bohemian National Hall. Built by Panzica Construction, the volleyball court (which shared the ballroom) and the gymnastics practice area (on the fourth floor) moved to the addition once it was finished.

See also
 Broadway Avenue Historic District (Cleveland, Ohio)

References

External links

 Sokol Greater Cleveland - Bohemian National Hall

Czech-American culture in Cleveland
National Register of Historic Places in Cleveland, Ohio
Buildings and structures in Cleveland
Cultural infrastructure completed in 1896
Slavic Village
Sokol in the United States
1896 establishments in Ohio